Khaled Nawaf (Arabic: خالد نواف) (born 27 March 1989) is a Qatari footballer. He currently plays for Lusail .

External links
 

Qatari footballers
1989 births
Living people
Al-Sailiya SC players
Al-Arabi SC (Qatar) players
Al-Khor SC players
Al Kharaitiyat SC players
Al-Shamal SC players
Lusail SC players
Qatar Stars League players
Qatari Second Division players
Association football defenders